Alexandr Kazakov (born 31 August 1986) is a Belarusian figure skater and coach. He is a two-time Belarusian national champion and reached the free skate at two ISU Championships – 2008 Europeans in Zagreb and 2010 Worlds in Turin. His coaches included Evgeni Tarasov, Vladimir Klochko, Nikolai Komarovski, Alexei Urmanov, and Oksana Kazakova.

After retiring from competition, Kazakov became a skating coach in Minsk, Belarus. He has coached Vitali Luchanok, Mikhail Karaliuk, and Ksenia Bakusheva.

Programs

Competitive highlights

References

External links 
 

1986 births
Belarusian male single skaters
Figure skating coaches
Living people
People from Kirov, Kirov Oblast
Russian emigrants to Belarus
Competitors at the 2009 Winter Universiade
20th-century Belarusian people
21st-century Belarusian people